(born 15 September 1963 in Kanagawa Prefecture) is a Japanese manga artist. He received the 38th Shogakukan Manga Award for general manga in 1993 for Miyamoto kara Kimi e. His manga The World Is Mine was chosen by the editors of Pulp for their Manga Hell list of controversial manga.

He attended Kawawa High School and graduated from the Meiji University.

Works 
 Hachigatsu no Hikari (1 volume)
 Miyamoto kara Kimi e (12 volumes)
 Itoshi no Irene (6 volumes originally, reprinted in 2)
 Amanatsu (short story collection, 1 volume)
 The World Is Mine (14 volumes, reprinted in 5)
 Kiichi!! (9 volumes)
 Kiichi VS (11 volumes, serialized in Big Comic Superior)
 Sugar (8 volumes)
 Rin (3 volumes, serialized in Bessatsu Young Mangazine - sequel to Sugar)

References

1963 births
Living people
Manga artists from Kanagawa Prefecture
Meiji University alumni